Milaq (also Romanized as Mīlaq, Meylaq, and Meyleq; also known as Meila, Meyla, and Meylī) is a village in Dizmar-e Markazi Rural District, Kharvana District, Varzaqan County, East Azerbaijan Province, Iran. At the 2006 census, its population was 116, in 27 families.

References 

Towns and villages in Varzaqan County